Solvychegodsky (masculine), Solvychegodskaya (feminine), or Solvychegodskoye (neuter) may refer to:
Solvychegodsky District, a former district of Northern Dvina Governorate (1924–1929) and Arkhangelsk Oblast (1938–1958) in the Russian SFSR
Solvychegodsky Uyezd, an administrative division in the Russian Empire and the early Russian SFSR; most recently (1918–1924) a part of Northern Dvina Governorate
Solvychegodskoye Urban Settlement, a municipal formation which the town of Solvychegodsk and ninety-three rural localities in Kotlassky District of Arkhangelsk Oblast, Russia are incorporated as
Solvychegodsky Selsoviet, an administrative division of Kotlassky District in Arkhangelsk Oblast, Russia